Gaston Thomson was a French politician born 29 January 1848 in Oran, French Algeria; died 14 May 1932 at Bône (Algeria).

He was a member of the French Chamber of Deputies for the Department of Constantine for fifty years and three months. He was Minister of Commerce, Industry, Posts and Telegraphs from 13 June 1914 to 29 October 1915.
As Minister of the Navy in the Cabinets of Clemenceau and Rouvier, his tenure saw the construction of numerous warships, cruisers and battleships, improving the power of the French Navy.

On 6 June 1897 he fought a duel with fellow Deputy Leon Mirman, a Radical Socialist, in which Mirman was slightly wounded in the forearm.  The duel grew out of an article written by the latter attacking Thomson.

References

1848 births
1932 deaths
People from Oran
People of French Algeria
Pieds-Noirs
Republican Union (France) politicians
Democratic Republican Alliance politicians
Independent Radical politicians
Ministers of Marine
French Ministers of Commerce, Industry, Posts, and Telegraphs
Members of the 1st Chamber of Deputies of the French Third Republic
Members of the 2nd Chamber of Deputies of the French Third Republic
Members of the 3rd Chamber of Deputies of the French Third Republic
Members of the 4th Chamber of Deputies of the French Third Republic
Members of the 5th Chamber of Deputies of the French Third Republic
Members of the 6th Chamber of Deputies of the French Third Republic
Members of the 7th Chamber of Deputies of the French Third Republic
Members of the 8th Chamber of Deputies of the French Third Republic
Members of the 9th Chamber of Deputies of the French Third Republic
Members of the 10th Chamber of Deputies of the French Third Republic
Members of the 11th Chamber of Deputies of the French Third Republic
Members of the 12th Chamber of Deputies of the French Third Republic
Members of the 13th Chamber of Deputies of the French Third Republic
Members of the 14th Chamber of Deputies of the French Third Republic
Members of the 15th Chamber of Deputies of the French Third Republic